Radio Battalions are tactical signals intelligence units of Marine Corps Intelligence. There are currently three operational Radio Battalions in the Marine Corps organization: 1st, 2nd, and 3rd. In fleet operations, teams from Radio Battalions are most often attached to the command element of Marine Expeditionary Units.

Concept

A Radio Battalion consists mainly of signals intelligence and electronic intelligence operators organized into smaller tactical units with different roles. Basic collection teams consist of 4–6 operators using specialized equipment based in HMMWVs. A variation on this is the MEWSS (Mobile Electronic Warfare Support System), which is an amphibious light armored vehicle equipped with similar electronic warfare equipment. MEWSS crews serve dual roles as electronic warfare operators and LAV crewmen. Radio Reconnaissance Platoons serve in a special operations role where the use of standard collection teams is not possible, such as covert infiltrations or tactical recovery of aircraft and personnel (TRAP).

History

In June 1943, 2nd Radio Intelligence Platoon was activated at Camp Elliott, California. The unit took part in the Battle of Guadalcanal and the Battle of Peleliu. The 3rd Radio Intelligence Platoon was also formed in June 1943 and took part in the Battles of the Kwajalein Atoll and Okinawa. 

General Alfred M. Gray Jr., who served as the 29th Commandant of the Marine Corps from 1 July 1987 until his retirement on 30 June 1991, is considered the founding father of post-war Marine Corps signals intelligence (SIGINT).  In 1955 then Captain Gray was tasked with forming two SIGINT units, one to be assigned to Europe and the other to the Pacific area, chosen from Marines undergoing Manual Morse intercept training.  Captain Gray established the Pacific team at NSG Kamiseya, Japan in May 1956. 

In 1958 then-Captain Gray was assigned to Hawaii to form and activate the 1st Radio Company, a tactical signals intelligence (SIGINT) unit, where he would serve from September 1958 to May 1961.  From World War II until the early 1960s, various units performed radio intercepts, growing from platoon to company and, in 1964, to 1st Radio Battalion.

Sub-units of the battalion were deployed to Vietnam from 1965 to 1975, including participation in evacuation efforts during the Fall of Saigon. In the early 1980s, 2nd Radio Battalion was part of the multinational peacekeeping force in Beirut, Lebanon. More recently, Radio Battalions served in Operation Desert Storm, Somalia, Kosovo, the 2003 Invasion of Iraq, and the 2004 Operation Phantom Fury in Fallujah. Radio Battalions also send detachments to augment intelligence efforts at Guantanamo Bay Naval Base, Cuba, and at other bases throughout the world.

In Afghanistan, Radio Battalion proved especially effective against improvised explosive devices.

Organization

1st Radio Battalion

1st Radio Battalion, reformed in August 2004, is based at Marine Corps Base Camp Pendleton, California, and supports the I Marine Expeditionary Force (I MEF). The battalion maintains four companies: Alpha, Bravo, Charlie and H&S Companies. 1st Radio Battalion was first based at Marine Corps Base Hawaii, Kāneohe Bay, and operated out of there for several decades until it was reformed at Camp Pendleton.

Chronology and Summary of Operations

2nd Radio Intelligence Platoon

What is now 1st Radio Battalion began as 2nd Radio Intelligence Platoon, activated during World War II on 14 June 1943 at Camp Linda Vista, Camp Elliott, California.

14 June 1943 Activated and designated 2nd Radio Intelligence Platoon

December 1943 Relocated to Pacific Theater

January 1944 Participated in the Solomon Islands (Guadalcanal)

31 July 1944 Reassigned to the 1st Marine Division, Fleet Marine Forces

August 1944 Relocated to the Carolina Islands

September 1944 Participated in the Battle of Peleliu

2nd Radio Separate Intelligence Platoon

20 October 1944 Redesignated 2nd Separate Radio Intelligence Platoon

November 1944 Relocated to Pearl Harbor, Hawaii Territory

8 March 1945 Deactivated

24 May 1945 Reactivated at Wahiawa, Hawaii Territory

28 September 1945 Deactivated

After deactivation on 28 September 1945, personnel were assigned to other Radio Intercept Platoons, which were located in Naval Radio Stations in Guam and in China. They remained there during part of the early China Occupation, and most of them returned to the United States near the end of January and February 1946.

1st Radio Company

15 September 1958 Reactivated at Camp Smith, Territory of Hawaii as 1st Radio Company.

June 1959 Relocated from Camp Smith to Kaneohe Bay, Marine Corps Air Station.

1st Composite Radio Company

8 September 1959 Redesignated as 1st Composite Radio Company.

2 January 1962 Deployed to Pleiku, South Vietnam as Detachment One under the command of Captain John K. Hyatt, Jr.

17 September 1963 Redesignated as 1st Radio Company, Kaneohe Bay, Hawaii.

1st Radio Battalion

14 July 1964 Redesignated as 1st Radio Battalion, FMF at Kaneohe Bay under the command of Major Henry Vod der Heyde.

February 1967 Deployed to Danang, South Vietnam as Sub-Unit One.

1 March 1969 Sub-Unit one merged into 1st Radio Battalion, FMF, Camp Horn, Danang, South Vietnam

October 1970 Elements (Sub-Unit 2) assisted US Army unit in Udorn, Thailand. An Army Unit Commendation was authorized.

April 1971 Redeployed to Marine Corps Station, Kaneohe, Hawaii.

April 1971 Sub-Unit 2, 1st Radio Battalion deactivated and merged back into 1st Radio Battalion, FMF, Kaneohe, Hawaii. Major L. K. Russell was in command of Sub-Unit 2 and LtCol Ed Resnick was the 1st Radio Battalion Commander. Shortly thereafter, date unknown, LtCol John K. Hyatt, Jr. took command.

April 1972 Elements returned to South Vietnam in support of the 9th Marine Amphibious Brigade under the command of Brigadier General Miller abroad the U.S.S Blue Ridge and other naval ships. Several members were authorized the Combat Action Ribbon during this period.

April 1975 Elements participated in evacuations in Southeast Asia.

May 1975 Elements participated in the recovery of the SS Mayaguaez.

Unit Commanders

1stLt Marcus J. Couts 09112/0200 USMC 14 June 1943 – 5 May 1944

2ndLt Walter C. Smith 010462/0225 USMC 6 May 1944 – 27 January 1945

2ndLt Jack Evans 043139/0225 USMC 28 February 1945 – 8 March 1945

Capt Marcus J. Couts 09112/0225 USMC 28 May 1945 – 28 September 1945

LtCol John K. Hyatt, Jr. ?-1973

LtCol Carl W. Kachaukas 1973-?

Casualties

World War II

(20–23 September 1944 Peleliu Island 'Palau Group', Carolina Islands)

Wounded in Action

Name (Military Occupational Specialty)

Keith K. Bean (776 High Speed Intercept Operator)

Carter D. Bucy (405 Administration)

Edward W. Clark (641 Telephoneman)

Glenn C. Erwin (641 Telephoneman)

Julius f. Harder (739 High Speed Intercept Operator)

John H. Maynard (766 High Speed Radio Operator)

H. Riffle (unknown)

Killed in Action

Rank/Name/ Service No. (MOS)/Date of Death

PFC William J. Hughes Jr. 00500585 (unknown) 23 September 1944

Cpl Josephe A. Prete 00440073 (739 Intercept Operator) 20 September 1944

Cpl Stephen J. Weber 00454532 (unknown) 20 September 1944

Vietnam

Killed in Action

Rank/Name/MOS/Date of Death

Capt James Westley Ayers 2502, 26 May 1967

Cpl Stephen Lee Traughber 2575, 10 September 1967

LCpl Larry Allan Jones 2571, 24 April 1968

Sgt Paul Jay Kingery 2571, 13 May 1968

MGySgt Edward Reynold Storm 2578, 28 December 1969

Sgt Larry Wade Duke 2571, 10 March 1970

Sgt Robert Hrisoulis 2571, 21 January 1971

Operation Enduring Freedom - Afghanistan

Killed in Action

Sgt Lucas Todd Pyeatt 2676, 5 February 2011

Unit Honors

World War II

American Campaign Streamer

Asiatic-Pacific Campaign Streamer with three Bronze Stars

1.     Defense of Guadalcanal

2.     Consolidation of Solomon Islands

3.     Western Carolines Operation

World War II Victory Streamer

Navy Unit Commendation Streamer with One Bronze Star

1.     1 December 1943 to September 1944 (while assigned to the Signal Battalion, III Marine Amphibious Corps)

2.     14 June 1943 to 2 September 1945 (as component of Naval Communications Intelligence Organization)

Vietnam

Navy Unit commendation - 31 October 1968 to 31 July 1969 for support of twenty-five major combat operations in Republic of Vietnam.

Navy Meritorious Unit Commendation

1.     1 August 1969 – 9 March 1970 for Combat Operations Pinestone Canyon, Iroquouis Grove, Arlington Canyon, Idaho Canyon, Georgia Tar, Fulton Square, and Durham Peak in support of Vandergrift Combat Base, Dong Ha Mountain and Dong Ha Combat Base, Con Theien, Hill 327, Hill 37, Hill 55, An Hoa and Danang.

2.     10 March 1970 to 3 April 1971 for Combat Operations Imperial lake, Pickens Forest, Catawaba Falls, Tulare Falls and Upshur Stream.

Vietnam Service Streamer with two Silver Stars

1.     1969 – 1970

2.     1970 – 1971

Vietnam Cross of Gallantry with Palm Streamer – 1969 – 1970

National Defense Service Streamer – 1969 – 1970

Army Meritorious Unit Commendation – Elements of 1st Radio Battalion, FMF serving with the 7th Radio Research Field Station, Udorn, Thailand (11 November 1970 – 26 February 1971)

Philippine Presidential Unit Commendation – Elements of the 1st Radio Battalion, FMF serving with the 9th MAB during 21 July 1972 – 15 August 1972

Operation Iraqi Freedom

During the battle for Diyala Bridge in Operation Iraqi Freedom (OIF), 1st RadBn supported Regimental Combat Team-1 (RCT-1) with an operational control element (OCE) and a SIGINT Support Team (SST) that identified Iraqi conduct of fire nets and Iraqi forward observers preparing to call in artillery fire on RCT-1.   The RadBn OCE coordinated via the RCT-1 air officer with a Marine EA-6B "Prowler" from VMAQ-2 to jam the conduct of fire net for the duration of RCT-1's assault, resulting in the inability of Iraqi Army units defending the bridge to call in artillery on the RCT-1 units.

2nd Radio Battalion

2nd Radio Battalion, also known as America's Radio Battalion, is the oldest Radio Battalion having been established as the 1st Radio Intelligence Platoon, Signals Company, Headquarters Battalion, 1st Marine Division on 2 January 1943. 2nd Radio Battalion (informally known as RadBn) based at Marine Corps Base Camp Lejeune, North Carolina, supports the II Marine Expeditionary Force (II MEF). The battalion consists of three operations companies and a Headquarters and Support company. Alpha Company consists of Operation and Control Element's (OCE) 1 and 2 and an Operation Control and Analysis Center (OCAC). Bravo company is charged with supporting the 22nd, 24th and 26th Marine Expeditionary Units. Bravo supplies Collection Teams, Analysts and also contains MEWSS Teams and Radio Reconnaissance Teams. Charlie Company currently has two OCEs and currently serves as an EAS platoon for those Marines about to get out and a training platoon for new Marines arriving from MOS School. Headquarters and Support Company supports all activities of Alpha, Bravo and Charlie companies as needed.
In 2011, Sgt. Paul Boothroyd of 2nd Radio Battalion notably survived being shot in the head by a round fired from a 7.62 x 54mm Dragunov sniper in Afghanistan. The bullet reportedly pierced his kevlar helmet and was deflected into his neck. The round was later surgically removed. On the same deployment, during a combat operation, Sgt Lucas Todd Pyeatt was killed by an IED while approaching Taliban insurgents in Machi Kehyl, Kajaki District, Helmand Province.  Luke was Charlie Co. SIGINT Support Team 6 team leader and insisted on taking the first patrol so he would have a better understanding of the area to better prepare his team for similar actions. For this action Luke was awarded the Director of National Intelligence Medal of Valor.  Luke's name has also been added to the National Security Agency Wall of Honor.  He is buried in Section 60 at Arlington National Cemetery.

3rd Radio Battalion

3rd Radio Battalion, located aboard Marine Corps Base Hawaii in Kāneohe Bay, traces its lineage to 1943 with the creation of the 3d Radio Intelligence Platoon. Most recently, since August 2003, the Battalion has served in a dual support role of both I and III Marine Expeditionary Force including providing the signals intelligence support platoon for the 31st Marine Expeditionary Unit. Following the units return from Iraq in February 2006, 3d Radio Battalion began focusing on supporting the Global War on Terrorism, most notably by providing personnel to SOCPAC in support of Operation Enduring Freedom – Philippines

In October 2008 3rd Radio Battalion deployed as part of SPMAGTF-A to Helmand Province in Southern Afghanistan as part of the ISAF troop surge, and participated in several major operations including the Battle of Now Zad as well as Operation Khanjar.

See also

 List of United States Marine Corps battalions

References

External links
 1st Radio Battalion Home Page
2nd Radio Battalion Home Page
3rd Radio Battalion Home Page
 Story on 1st Bn's redesignation as 3rd Bn
 MEWSS information
 1st Radio Battalion Vietnam Veterans Site
 2nd Radio Battalion Lineage
 2nd Radio Battalion Organizational History

Battalions of the United States Marine Corps
Cryptography organizations